Erik Spady (born June 1, 1989) is a Canadian professional ice hockey defenceman. He is currently playing with the Brampton Beast of the Central Hockey League.

Spady attended Northern Michigan University where he played four seasons (2007-2011) of NCAA college major hockey with the Northern Michigan Wildcats, registering 20 points and 110 penalty minutes in 134 games played.

Spady played the 2011–12 season in the Central Hockey League (CHL) with the Texas Brahmas. On January 15, 2013, the Toledo Walleye signed Spady to a contract and he joined the team mid-way through the 2012–13 ECHL season.

References

External links

1989 births
Living people
Canadian ice hockey defencemen
Northern Michigan Wildcats men's ice hockey players
Toledo Walleye players
Grand Rapids Griffins players
Fort Worth Brahmas players
Brampton Beast players